José María Lavalle Covarrubias (born 21 April 1902 - death 7 July 1984) was a Peruvian football forward who played for Peru in the 1930 FIFA World Cup. He also played for Alianza Lima.

International career
He earned a total of 11 caps for Peru, scoring no goals.

References

External links

FIFA profile

1902 births
1984 deaths
Footballers from Lima
Peruvian footballers
Peru international footballers
Association football forwards
Club Alianza Lima footballers
Peruvian Primera División players
1930 FIFA World Cup players